Corbière railway station is a former station in La Corbière, the extreme south-western point on the Island of Jersey in the Channel Islands. Located in the Parish of  Saint Brélade, it was the western terminus of the Jersey Railway which ran along the south coast to the capital town of the island, Saint Helier.

The station had a relatively short life, opening on 1 July 1899 and closing 30 September 1936, although the track was briefly re-laid and the line re-opened for freight during the German occupation of the Channel Islands.

The station building, platform and track bed are still extant, with the building having a large glass extension added in 2008. A modern bus route that serves the same towns and villages ends outside the front of the station building.

References

Transport in Jersey
History of Jersey
Disused railway stations in the Channel Islands
Railway stations opened in 1899
Railway stations closed in 1936